All the Magic is the second album by Lester Bowie recorded for ECM. It was released in 1982 as a double LP with the first disc consisting of band performances and a second disc of solo trumpet improvisations by Bowie.

Reception
The Allmusic review by Scott Yanow awarded the album 3 stars, stating, "All in all, this two-fer shows off both Lester Bowie's playing abilities and his sense of humor."

Track listing
Disc One
 "For Louie" (Wilson) - 12:14
 "Spacehead" - 6:47
 "Ghosts" (Ayler) - 3:09
 "Trans Traditional Suite" - 15:51
 "Let The Good Times Roll" (Shirley Goodman, Leonard Lee) - 6:47
Disc Two
 "Organic Echo Part I" - 3:17
 "Dunce Dance" - 2:05
 "Charlie M. Part II" - 2:49
 "Thirsty?" - 3:34
 "Almost Christmas" - 3:52
 "Down Home" - 2:40
 "Okra Influence" - 4:38
 "Miles Davis Meets Donald Duck" - 1:49
 "Deb Deb's Face" - 2:03
 "Monkey Waltz" - 1:47
 "Fradulent Fanfare" - 1:01
 "Organic Echo Part II" - 5:27
All compositions by Lester Bowie except as indicated

Personnel
Lester Bowie - trumpet
Ari Brown - tenor and soprano saxophones
Art Matthews - piano
Fred Williams - bass
Phillip Wilson - drums
Fontella Bass - vocals
David Peaston - vocals

References 

1982 albums
ECM Records albums
Lester Bowie albums
Albums produced by Manfred Eicher